Eric Jonas Esbjörs (born November 1, 1973, in Gothenburg, Sweden) is a retired professional Swedish ice hockey player. He spent many years as a winger for Frölunda HC in the Elitserien.

On 5 October 2019, Frölunda HC held a ceremony for players who had played more than 500 games for the club. One of them was Jonas Esbjörs.

He is the son of ice hockey player Lars-Erik Esbjörs.

References

External links

1973 births
HV71 players
Frölunda HC players
Living people
Swedish ice hockey forwards
Ice hockey people from Gothenburg